The 2018 Caribbean Premier League (CPLT20) or for sponsorship reasons, Hero CPL 2018 was the sixth season of the Caribbean Premier League, the domestic Twenty20 cricket league in the West Indies. Matches were played in seven countries – Trinidad and Tobago, Saint Kitts and Nevis, Guyana, Barbados, Jamaica, Saint Lucia, with three of the matches were played at Lauderhill, Florida, United States. The tournament started on 8 August 2018.

In July 2018, two changes to the playing conditions were announced for the tournament. The first was a penalty to a team's net run rate for failing to bowl their overs in the given time. The second change was the introduction of a coin toss, to determine who will bat first if a Super Over is needed to decide the result of the match. The Decision Review System (DRS) was used in the last two matches of the tournament.

Trinbago Knight Riders beat Guyana Amazon Warriors by eight wickets in the final to win their third CPL title.

Squads
The following players were selected for the tournament:

Shakib Al Hasan decided not to play in this edition, and he was replaced by Steve Smith

Points table

 Last Update: 10 September 2018.
 Top four teams advanced to the Playoffs
  advanced to the Qualifier 1
  advanced to the Eliminator

League stage
All times are in the respective local times.

Playoffs
All times are in the respective local time

Bracket

Qualifier 1

Eliminator

Qualifier 2

Final

Statistics

Most runs

 Last Update: 17 September 2018.
 Source: Cricinfo

Most wickets

 Last Update: 17 September 2018.
 Source: Cricinfo

References

External links
 Official web site
 Series home at ESPN Cricinfo

Caribbean Premier League
Caribbean Premier League
Caribbean Premier League
2018 in Caribbean sport